Port au Port is a defunct provincial electoral district for the House of Assembly of Newfoundland and Labrador, Canada. As of 2011, there were 8,439 eligible voters living within the district.

The district covers the Port au Port Peninsula, and is among the poorest in the province. The district also has a substantial francophone population.

The district was abolished in 2015 and replaced by Stephenville-Port au Port.

Communities
It contains the western part of the town of Stephenville, as well as the communities of Abraham's Cove, Aguathuna, Berry Head, Black Duck Brook, Boswarlos, Campbell's Creek, Cape St. George, De Grau, Felix Cove, Fox Island River, Jerry's Nose, Kippens, Lourdes, Lower Cove, Mainland, Marches Point, Piccadilly, Point au Mal, Port au Port, Red Brook, Sheaves Cove, Ship Cove, Three Rock Cove, West Bay, West Bay Centre and Winterhouse.

Members of the House of Assembly
The district has elected the following Members of the House of Assembly:

Election results

|-

|-

|-
 
|NDP
|Jamie Brace
|align="right"|860
|align="right"|19.44%
|align="right"|
|}

|-

|-

|}

References

External links 
Website of the Newfoundland and Labrador House of Assembly

Newfoundland and Labrador provincial electoral districts
Stephenville, Newfoundland and Labrador